The 2016 Patriot League men's basketball tournament was played March 1, 3, 6 and 9 with the higher seed in each matchup hosting at their respective campus sites. The tournament champion, Holy Cross, received the League's automatic bid to the NCAA tournament.

Seeds
Teams were seeded by conference record, with ties broken in the following order:
 Record between the tied teams.
 Record against the highest-seeded team not involved in the tie, going down through the seedings as necessary.
 Higher RPI entering the conference tournament.

Schedule

Bracket

* indicates overtime period.

References

External links
 2016 Patriot League Men's Basketball Championship

Patriot League men's basketball tournament
Tournament
Patriot League men's basketball tournament